Louis Warren Hill Jr. (May 19, 1902 – April 6, 1995) was an American businessman and politician. He was the son of Louis W. Hill and Maud Van Cortlandt Taylor. His grandfather was railroad tycoon James J. Hill.

Hill was born in Saint Paul, Minnesota. He attended Saint Paul Academy and graduated from Phillips Exeter Academy in 1920. Hill went to the University of Minnesota,  to Yale University, and to Oxford University. Hill was involved with the Great Northern Railway and the banking business in Saint Paul, Minnesota. He served in the Minnesota Senate from 1937 to 1952. He died at his home in North Oaks, Minnesota and was buried in Mendota Heights, Minnesota.

References

1902 births
1995 deaths
Politicians from Saint Paul, Minnesota
Businesspeople from Saint Paul, Minnesota
Phillips Exeter Academy alumni
Yale University alumni
University of Minnesota alumni
Alumni of the University of Oxford
Minnesota state senators
Great Northern Railway (U.S.)